Literature from the "Axis of Evil" is an anthology of short stories, poems and excerpts from novels by twenty writers from seven countries, translated into English (often for the first time), and published by Words Without Borders in 2006.

The purpose of the anthology, as described in the editors' note, is to increase "American access to world literature in translation". The editors wrote:

The editors selected works, all published in the second half of the 20th or early 21st century, by authors living in, or originating from, Iran, Iraq, North Korea, Syria, Libya, Sudan and Cuba. A brief overview of the contemporary literature of each country is provided, to set the writings in their specific national context.

Writers and works included
 Iran
 Houshang Moradi-Kermani: "The Vice-Principal" (short story, 1979)
 Tirdad Zolghadr: excerpt from the novella A Little Less Conversation (2006)
 Ahmad Shamlou: "Existence" (poem, 1957)
 Iraq
 Salah Al-Hamdani: "Baghdad My Beloved" (poem, 2003)
 Sherko Fatah: excerpt from the novel At the Borderline (2001)
 Muhsin Al-Ramli: excerpt from the novel Scattered Crumbs (late 1990s)
 Saadi Youssef: "Five Crosses" (poem, 1961)
 Fadhil Al-Azzawi: "Hameed Nylon", first chapter of the novel The Last of the Angels (1992)
 North Korea
 Kang Kwi-mi: "A Tale of Music" (short story, 2003)
 Hong Seok-jung: excerpt from the novel Hwangjini (2002)
 Lim Hwa-won: "The Fifth Photograph" (short story, 2001)
 Byungu Chon: "Falling Persimmons" (poem, 1992)
 Syria
 Hanna Mina: "On the Sacks" (short story, 1976)
 Salim Barakat: excerpt from the novel Jurists of Darkness (1985)
 Libya
 Khamel al-Maghur: "The Soldiers' Plumes", excerpt from the memoir Stations (late 1990s or early 2000s)
 Ashur Etwebi: "The Place Will Fit Everything" (poem)
 Sudan
 Tarek Eltayeb: "Coffee and Water" (poem, 1999)
 Tarek Eltayeb: "The Sweetest Tea with the Most Beautiful Woman in the World" (short story, 1993)
 Cuba
 Anna Lidía Vega Serova: "Project for a Commemorative Mural (Mixed Media)" (poem, 2001)
 Francisco García Gonzáles: "Women of the Federation" (short story, 2003)
 Raúl Rivero: "I Don't Want Anyone Coming Around to Save Me" (poem, 2002)

Critical reviews

For The Daily Telegraph, Ceri Radford  wrote:

Chandrahas Choudhury of The Indian Express also provided a positive review:

See also
 Lullabies from the Axis of Evil
 Holidays in the Axis of Evil

Notes

References

External links
 Official website of Words Without Borders
 "Literature and Lullabies from the 'Axis of Evil'", National Public Radio, October 12, 2006

2006 books
American anthologies
The New Press books